Riedsee bei Leeheim is a lake in Hesse, Germany. At an elevation of 80 m, its surface area is ca. 24 ha.

Lakes of Hesse